Rudolph W. E. Fritzke (born October 7, 1849 in Germany), was a member of the Wisconsin State Assembly. He moved to the United States in 1867, later working as a teacher in Fond du Lac, Wisconsin and Milwaukee, Wisconsin. He served as a truant officer for the Milwaukee schools for 20 years.

Political career
Fritzke was elected to the Assembly in 1902. He was a Democrat and represented the 13th district.

References

External links
The Political Graveyard

German emigrants to the United States
Politicians from Fond du Lac, Wisconsin
Politicians from Milwaukee
Democratic Party members of the Wisconsin State Assembly
1849 births
Year of death missing